Atlantic Command was a formation of the Canadian Army created during the Second World War to strengthen and administer home defence facilities on Canada's Atlantic Coast.
A second major function was to train reinforcements to be sent to
the Canadian divisions in Europe.  Most of those soldiers received and
trained with their personal weapons in Camp Debert before being
transported by train to Halifax where they embarked on troop ships that took them to Britain.

Atlantic Command combined the pre-war
Military District No. 6 (Prince Edward Island and Nova Scotia) with Military District No. 7 (New Brunswick) and
Military District No. 5 (the eastern part of the Province of Quebec bordering the Gulf of Saint Lawrence).
Extending the existing military cooperation among Canada, the Dominion of Newfoundland and the United Kingdom, Atlantic Command also controlled Canadian personnel stationed in Newfoundland.

Composition
Halifax Fortress
1st (Halifax) Coast Regiment, Royal Canadian Artillery (RCA)
21st Anti-Aircraft Regiment, RCA
Lanark and Renfrew Scottish Regiment
2nd Battalion, Black Watch (R.H.R.) of Canada (attached from 7th Cdn Inf Div)
Saint John Defences
3rd (New Brunswick) Coast Regiment, RCA
22nd Anti-Aircraft Regiment, RCA
Le Régiment de Chateauguay (Militia)
Prince Edward Island Highlanders
Sydney and Canso Defences
16th Coast Regiment, RCA
23rd Anti-Aircraft Regiment, RCA
Les Fusiliers du St. Laurent (less two companies)
2nd/10th Dragoons C.I.C (attached from 7th Cdn Inf Div)
Shelburne Defences
104th Coast Battery, RCA
One company of Les Fusiliers du St. Laurent
Gaspé Defences
105th Coast Battery, RCA
One company of Les Fusiliers du St. Laurent
Goose Bay Defences
108th Coast Battery, RCA
New Brunswick Rangers
Newfoundland (based in St. John's)
25th Anti-Aircraft Regiment, RCA
26th Anti-Aircraft Regiment, RCA
103rd Coast Battery, RCA
106th Coast Battery, RCA
Le Régiment de Joliette
Pictou Highlanders
Lincoln and Welland Regiment (until May 1943)
Le Régiment de St. Hyacinthe (from May 1943)
7th Canadian Infantry Division, Mar. 1942 - Oct. 1943
Divisional troops based at Camp Debert, Nova Scotia
15th Infantry Brigade (based at Camp Debert)
17th Infantry Brigade (based at Camp Sussex, New Brunswick)
20th Infantry Brigade (based at Camp Debert)

Commanders
The following two generals served as General Officer Commanding in Chief Atlantic Command:
 Major-General William Henry Pferinger Elkins, Aug. 1, 1940 to July 15, 1943
 Major-General L. F. Page, July 16, 1943, to Aug. 26, 1944

See also
 Pacific Command (Canadian Army), corresponding command on the Pacific Coast
 5th Canadian Division, the present-day formation in the Canadian Forces
 Canadian Northwest Atlantic Command, Allied naval command responsible for guarding the North Atlantic shipping lanes during the Battle of the Atlantic

References

 Stacey, C.P. The Canadian Army 1939-1945 (Queen's Printer, 1948)
 Law, Clive M. Distinguishing Patches (Service Publications, Ottawa, 2002)

Canadian World War II commands
Military units and formations established in 1942
Military units and formations disestablished in 1945